Richard Hyman (born March 8, 1927) is an American jazz pianist and composer. Over a 70-year career, he has worked as a pianist, organist, arranger, music director, electronic musician, and composer. He was named a National Endowment for the Arts Jazz Masters fellow in 2017. His grandson is designer and artist Adam Charlap Hyman.

As a pianist, Hyman has been praised for his versatility. DownBeat magazine characterized him as "a pianist of longstanding grace and bountiful talent, with an ability to adapt to nearly any historical style, from stride to bop to modernist sound-painting."

Early life 
Hyman was born in New York City on March 8, 1927 to Joseph C. Hyman and Lee Roven, and grew up in suburban Mount Vernon, New York. His older brother, Arthur, owned a jazz record collection and introduced him to the music of Bix Beiderbecke and Art Tatum. 

Hyman was trained classically by his mother's brother, the concert pianist Anton Rovinsky, who premiered The Celestial Railroad by Charles Ives in 1928. Hyman said of Rovinsky: "He was my most important teacher. I learned touch from him and a certain amount of repertoire, especially Beethoven. On my own I pursued Chopin. I loved his ability to take a melody and embellish it in different arbitrary ways, which is exactly what we do in jazz. Chopin would have been a terrific jazz pianist! His waltzes are in my improvising to this day."

Hyman enlisted in the U.S. Army in June 1945, and was transferred to the U.S. Navy band department. “Once I got into the band department, I was working with much more experienced musicians than I was used to," Hyman once stated. "I’d played in a couple of kid bands in New York, playing dances, but the Navy meant business — I had to show up, read music, and be with a bunch of better players than I had run into." After leaving the Navy he attended Columbia University. While there, Hyman won a piano competition, for which the prize was 12 free lessons with swing-era pianist Teddy Wilson. Hyman has said that he "fell in love with jazz" during this period.

Career 
Relax Records released Hyman's solo piano versions of "All the Things You Are" and "You Couldn't Be Cuter" around 1950. He recorded two honky-tonk piano albums under the pseudonym "Knuckles O'Toole" (including two original compositions), and recorded more as "Willie the Rock Knox" and "Slugger Ryan".

As a studio musician in the 1950s and early 1960s, Hyman performed with Tony Bennett, Perry Como, Guy Mitchell, Joni James, Marvin Rainwater, Ivory Joe Hunter, LaVern Baker, Ruth Brown, The Playmates, The Wildcats, The Kookie Cats, The Four Freshmen, The Four Sophomores, Mitch Miller, and many more. He played with Charlie Parker for Parker's only film appearance. His extensive television studio work in New York in the 1950s and early 1960s included a stint as music director for Arthur Godfrey's television show from 1959 to 1961.

Hyman has worked as composer, arranger, conductor, and pianist for the Woody Allen films Zelig, The Purple Rose of Cairo, Broadway Danny Rose, Stardust Memories, Hannah and Her Sisters, Radio Days, Bullets Over Broadway, Everyone Says I Love You, Sweet and Lowdown, The Curse of the Jade Scorpion and Melinda and Melinda. His other film scores include French Quarter, Moonstruck, Scott Joplin, The Lemon Sisters and Alan and Naomi. His music has also been heard in Mask, Billy Bathgate, Two Weeks Notice, and other films. He was music director of The Movie Music of Woody Allen, which premiered at the Hollywood Bowl.

Hyman composed and performed the score for the Cleveland/San Jose Ballet Company's Piano Man, and Twyla Tharp's The Bum's Rush for the American Ballet Theatre. He was the pianist/conductor/arranger in Tharp's Eight Jelly Rolls, Baker's Dozen, and The Bix Pieces and similarly arranged and performed for Miles Davis: Porgy and Bess, a choreographed production of the Dance Theater of Dallas. In 2007, his Adventures of Tom Sawyer, commissioned by the John G. Shedd Institute for the Arts and produced for the stage by Toni Pimble of the Eugene Ballet, premiered in Eugene, Oregon.

In the 1960s, Hyman recorded several pop albums on Enoch Light's Command Records. At first, he used the Lowrey organ, on the albums Electrodynamics (US No. 117), Fabulous (US No. 132), Keyboard Kaleidoscope and The Man from O.R.G.A.N. He later recorded several albums on the Moog synthesizer which mixed original compositions and cover versions, including Moog: The Electric Eclectics of Dick Hyman(Can No. 35), and The Age of Electronicus (US No. 110).

The track "The Minotaur" from The Electric Eclectics (1969) charted in the US top 40 (US R&B Singles No. 27; Hot 100 No. 38) (No. 20 Canada), becoming the first Moog single hit (although, as originally released on 45, it was labeled as the B-side to the shorter "Topless Dancers of Corfu"). Some elements from the track "The Moog and Me" (most notably the whistle that serves as the song's lead-in) on the same album were sampled by Beck for the track "Sissyneck" on his 1996 album Odelay.

Hyman has been a guest performer at jazz festivals and concert venues. Around 1995, Hyman and his wife, Julia, moved permanently to Venice, Florida.

Discography

As leader

As sideman 
With Ruby Braff
 Bugle Call Rag (Jazz Vogue, 1976)
 Fireworks (Inner City, 1985)
 Music from South Pacific (Concord Jazz, 1991)
 Very Sinatra (Red Baron, 1993)
 A Pipe Organ Recital Plus One (Bellaphon, 1996)
 Watch What Happens (Arbors, 2002)
 You Brought a New Kind of Love (Arbors, 2004)

With Jim Cullum Jr.
 New Year's All Star Jam (Pacific Vista, 1993)
 Honky Tonk Train (Riverwalk, 1994)
 Hot Jazz for a Cool Yule (Riverwalk, 1995)
 Fireworks! Red Hot & Blues (Riverwalk, 1996)
 American Love Songs (Riverwalk, 1997)

With Benny Goodman
 Date with the King (Columbia, 1956)
 Benny Goodman (Capitol, 1956)
 Benny Goodman Plays Selections from the Benny Goodman Story (Capitol, 1956)

With Urbie Green
 21 Trombones (Project 3, 1967)
 21 Trombones Rock, Blues, Jazz, Volume Two (Project 3, 1969)
 Green Power (Project 3, 1971)
 Bein' Green (Project 3, 1972)
 Oleo (Pausa, 1978)

With Enoch Light
 Show Spectacular (Grand Award, 1959)
 The Original Roaring 20's Volume 4 (Grand Award, 1961)
 Enoch Light and the Glittering Guitars (Project 3, 1969)
 Enoch Light Presents Spaced Out (Project 3, 1969)
 Permissive Polyphonics (Project 3, 1970)

With Wes Montgomery
 Fusion! (Riverside, 1963)
 Pretty Blue (Milestone, 1975)
 The Alternative Wes Montgomery (Milestone, 1982)
 Born to Be Blue (Riverside, 1983)

With Tony Mottola 
 Romantic Guitar (Command, 1963)
 Heart & Soul (Project 3, 1966)
 Guitar U.S.A. (Command, 1967)
 Lush, Latin & Lovely (Project 3, 1967)
 Roma Oggi - Rome Today (Project 3, 1968)
 Warm, Wild and Wonderful (Project 3, 1968)
 Tony Mottola's Guitar Factory (Project 3, 1970)
 Tony Mottola and the Quad Guitars (Project 3, 1973)

With Flip Phillips
 Flip Phillips Collates (Clef, 1952)
 A Real Swinger (Concord Jazz, 1988)
 Try a Little Tenderness (Chiaroscuro, 1993)
 Flip Philllips Celebrates His 80th Birthday at the March of Jazz 1995 (Arbors, 2003)

With Doc Severinsen
 Fever (Command, 1966)
 Live! (Command, 1966)
 The New Sound of Today's Big Band (Command, 1967)

With Bob Wilber
 Soprano Summit (World Jazz, 1974)
 Summit Reunion (Chiaroscuro, 1990)
 Bufadora Blow-up (Arbors, 1997)
 A Perfect Match (Arbors, 1998)
 Everywhere You Go There's Jazz (Arbors, 1999)
 A Tribute to Kenny Davern and 80th Birthday Salute to Bob Wilber (2009)

With others
 Howard Alden, Howard Alden Plays the Music of Harry Reser (Stomp Off, 1989)
 Louis Bellson and Gene Krupa, The Mighty Two (Roulette, 1963)
 Ruth Brown, Miss Rhythm (Atlantic, 1959)
 Evan Christopher, Delta Bound (Arbors, 2007)
 Don Elliott and Rusty Dedrick, Counterpoint for Six Valves (Riverside, 1959)
 Major Holley and Slam Stewart, Shut Yo' Mouth! (PM, 1987)
 J. J. Johnson, Goodies (RCA Victor, 1965)
 Mundell Lowe, The Mundell Lowe Quartet (Riverside, 1955)
 Mark Murphy, That's How I Love the Blues! (Riverside, 1963) – recorded in 1962
 Bette Midler, Songs for the New Depression (Atlantic, 1976) – recorded in 1972-76
 Sandy Stewart, Sandy Stewart Sings the Songs of Jerome Kern with Dick Hyman at the Piano (Audiophile, 1995) – recorded in 1994
 Toots Thielemans, The Whistler and His Guitar (Metronome, 1962)

As arranger
With Count Basie
The Board of Directors (Dot, 1967) with The Mills Brothers
How About This (Paramount, 1968) with Kay Starr
With Trigger Alpert
Trigger Happy! (Riverside, 1956)
With Flip Phillips
Try a Little Tenderness (Chiaroscuro, 1993)

References

External links
 radio interview with Doug Miles WSLR
 
 Dick Hyman Interview - NAMM Oral History Library (2006)
 
 

1927 births
20th-century American composers
20th-century American educators
20th-century American male musicians
20th-century American pianists
20th-century jazz composers
20th-century organists
21st-century American composers
21st-century American educators
21st-century American male musicians
21st-century American pianists
21st-century jazz composers
21st-century organists
American film score composers
American jazz composers
American jazz educators
American jazz organists
American jazz pianists
American male film score composers
American male jazz composers
American male organists
American male pianists
Arbors Records artists
Chiaroscuro Records artists
Columbia College (New York) alumni
Composers from New York City
Concord Records artists
Educators from New York City
Jazz musicians from New York (state)
Living people
MGM Records artists
Milestone Records artists
Music directors
Musicians from New York City
New York Jazz Repertory Company members
Ragtime composers
Ragtime pianists
RCA Victor artists
Stride pianists
Swing pianists